Barania Góra (Polish for "Ram Mountain") is a mountain in southern Poland. At a height of 1,220 metres (4003 feet), it is the second highest mountain in the Silesian Beskids, and the highest in the Polish part of Upper Silesia.

The sources of the Vistula, the longest Polish river, are located on the western slope of the mountain.

References 

Silesian Beskids
Silesian Beskids one-thousanders
Mountains of Poland